Princess Ajrabarni Rajkanya or Phra Chao Boromwongse Ther Phra Ong Chao Ajrabarni Rajkanya (RTGS: Atcharaphanni Ratchakanya) (7 July 1872 – 15 November 1910), was the Princess of Siam (later Thailand). She was a member of Siamese Royal Family. She was a daughter of Chulalongkorn, King Rama V of Siam.

Her mother was Chao Chom Manda Talab Ketutat, daughter of Phraya Viangnai Narubal. She had a younger brother, Prince Raphi Phatthanasak, the Prince of Ratchaburi, who is known as Father of the Thai Law.

Princess Ajrabarni Rajkanya died on 15 November 1910, a month after her father's death, at the age of 38.

Ancestry

1872 births
1910 deaths
19th-century Chakri dynasty
20th-century Chakri dynasty
19th-century Thai women
20th-century Thai women
19th-century Thai people
20th-century Thai people
Thai female Phra Ong Chao
Dames Grand Commander of the Order of Chula Chom Klao
Children of Chulalongkorn
Daughters of kings